Anna Wilson may refer to:

Anna Millward (née Wilson, born 1971), Australian cycle racer
Anna Wilson (madam) (1835–1911), pioneer madam in Omaha, Nebraska
Anna Wilson (swimmer) (born 1977), New Zealand Olympic swimmer
Anna Wilson (basketball) (born 1997), American basketball player

See also
Anna Wilson-Jones, British actress
Ann Wilson (disambiguation)
Anne Wilson (disambiguation)